El Hombre que Vino del Odio (also known as The Man Who Came from Hate and Run for Your Life) is a 1971 film directed by León Klimovsky. In 1974 a completely re-written and re-edited version was released in the USA under the title Mean Mother.

Plot
A deserter from Vietnam travels to Rome to kidnap an Albanian dancer.

References

External links

1971 films
1970s crime thriller films
1970s crime action films
Spanish action thriller films
Spanish crime thriller films
Films shot in Almería
Spanish crime action films
1970s Spanish-language films
1970s Spanish films